= Tommy Tihoni =

French Model

Tommy Tihoni (born 1996 or 1997) is a French Polynesian model and dancer. He won the Ori Tahiti Nui world championship in 2016.

Tihoni started dancing in 2012, and competed in the Heiva festival with the Tamariki Poerani group, and then with the Hura Tapairu. He competed in the Mister Papeete competition in 2014, coming third. He was awarded best male dancer at the Heiva festival in 2016, won the Ori Tahiti championship in 2016, and came second in 2022.

Since 2020 he has been assistant choreographer for the Hei ‘Ori dance school.
